Trichostetha capensis—also known as brunia beetle—is an afrotropical species of flower scarab beetle endemic to South Africa, where it occurs in the Cape Floristic Region.

References

Endemic beetles of South Africa
Cetoniinae
Beetles described in 1758
Taxa named by Carl Linnaeus